The 1996 European Judo Championships were the 7th edition of the European Judo Championships, and were held in The Hague, Netherlands on 19 May 1996.

Medal overview

Men

Women

Medal table

Results overview

Men

60 kg

65 kg

71 kg

78 kg

86 kg

95 kg

+95 kg

Open class

Women

48 kg

52 kg

56 kg

61 kg

66 kg

72 kg

+72 kg

Open class

References

External links
 

E
Judo Championships
European Judo Championships
J
Judo
20th century in The Hague
Judo competitions in the Netherlands
European Judo Championships